Leandro Guido Testa (born March 24, 1976 in General Belgrano, Buenos Aires) is a former footballer from Argentina who played as a defender.

Football career
Testa started out at Estudiantes de La Plata in 1996. He spent 6 years at the club, making 116 appearances during this period. In 2002, he chose to join Nueva Chicago where he indisputably earned a spot in the starting eleven since his arrival. In June 2004 he transferred to Arsenal de Sarandí, but returned to Chicago the following year after only 4 games played with el viaducto. In early 2007, Testa signed for Ferro Carril Oeste.

Coaching career
In July 2013, after retiring, Testa was appointed in a role at Nueva Chicago's management, as a link between players, coaching staff and leaders. He resigned at the end of the year.

In 2014, Testa began as a youth coach at Estudiantes LP. As of April 2021, Testa was still in the same position.

See also
Football in Argentina
List of football clubs in Argentina

References

External links
 Argentine Primera statistics at Futbol XXI  
 Profile at futbolpasion

1976 births
Living people
Sportspeople from Buenos Aires Province
Argentine footballers
Association football defenders
Argentina international footballers
Estudiantes de La Plata footballers
Nueva Chicago footballers
Arsenal de Sarandí footballers
Ferro Carril Oeste footballers